Pierre Clemens (August 2, 1913 in Redange – August 26, 1963 in Bettembourg) was a Luxembourgian cyclist. His brother Mathias Clemens was also a professional cyclist.

Major results
1936
 2nd Overall Tour de Luxembourg
 4th Overall Tour de France
1937
 1st  National Road Race Championships
 2nd Overall Tour de Luxembourg
1st Stage 3
1942
 4th Overall Tour de Luxembourg
1943
 3rd Overall Tour de Luxembourg
1st Stage 3

Results in the Tour de France
1936: 4th
1937: DNF
1938: DNF
1939: 20th

References

1913 births
1963 deaths
Luxembourgian male cyclists
People from Redange